The United States Penitentiary, Big Sandy (USP Big Sandy) is a high-security United States federal prison for male inmates in unincorporated Martin County, Kentucky, near the city of Inez. It is operated by the Federal Bureau of Prisons, a division of the United States Department of Justice. The facility also has a satellite prison camp which houses minimum-security male inmates.

Facility
USP Big Sandy is located both on a mountaintop removal mining site and a former underground coal mine. Due to the underground mine, the federal government spent $40 million to remediate the site before construction and had to spend additional millions after construction began to fix further issues, making the project the most expensive federal prison project at the time.  Harvard University owned the oil and gas rights to the property and was leasing that property to Columbia Gas at the start of the prison construction. 

The prison is known for housing multiple high-profile inmates. The facility houses a large number of people who were convicted of crimes in Washington, D.C. due to the National Capital Revitalization and Self-Government Improvement Act of 1997, which gave the Federal Bureau of Prisons custody of sentenced DC felons. As of 2013 up to about 33% had been convicted of DC crimes. Additionally, many federal inmates are sent there because they have been convicted of violent crimes and are now serving long sentences.

Notable incidents
Numerous violent incidents, mostly stabbings, have occurred at USP Big Sandy since it opened in 2003.

2006

In October 2006, USP Big Sandy inmate Terrell Johnson (16390-047), 33, who was serving a sentence for armed bank robbery, killed inmate Calvin Speight by stabbing him in the neck with a prison-made weapon known as a shank. Johnson pleaded guilty to the charge of second degree murder in August 2008 and was sentenced to 26 additional years in prison in 2009. Johnson is currently being held at USP Florence, the high security United States Penitentiary that is part of the Florence Complex in Colorado. He is scheduled for release in 2035.

On November 12, 2006, inmates Darryl Milburne (58478-066) and Dwaune Gravely (12867-050) beat and choked fellow inmate Shamoni Peterson to death. Milburne and Gravely were charged with murder, assault, and evidence tampering. Milburne pleaded guilty to second degree murder and was sentenced to an additional 17.5 years, while Gravely was convicted of first degree murder and sentenced to life without parole. Milburne was transferred to USP Hazelton and is scheduled for release on January 3, 2025. Gravely is at USP Atlanta.

2007
On November 4, 2007, USP Big Sandy inmate Eric Eymard (17628-045) repeatedly stabbed his cellmate in the neck with a shank. After the assault, Eymard told correctional officers that he had intended to kill his cellmate, who required surgery and hospitalization. On May 21, 2009, while being prepared for transportation from USP Big Sandy to a hearing in Federal District Court in Ashland, Kentucky, Eymard stabbed two correctional officers with a sharp weapon which he had shaped from plexiglas. 

As a result of Eymard's attack, one officer was left with cuts to his head and face and the other suffered a puncture wound under his left eye. Eymard subsequently pleaded guilty in connection with both incidents and was sentenced to 45 years in prison, which a federal judge ordered him to serve consecutively to his original sentence. Eymard is now at USP Allenwood.

2008
In early 2008, inmate Steven Michael Reid (11728-018) threw scalding water on a prison unit manager's face and neck. As a result of Reid's assault, the unit manager suffered first and second degree burns to the face, neck, and chest. Reid was sentenced to an additional 20 years in prison in February 2009.

Inmate Adam Oliveri (50045-054) stabbed a correctional officer in the head, back, and arm with a prison-made weapon on October 21, 2008, causing the officer to suffer several injuries. Oliveri was convicted after a three-day trial in 2010 and sentenced to an additional 17 years in prison, extending his release date to 2029. Oliveri is now at FCI Schuylkill.

On December 10, 2008, inmate Manuel Cardosa attacked a fellow inmate from behind as the inmate walked in a prison housing unit. Cardosa knocked the victim inmate to the floor and repeatedly jumped with both feet on his victim inmate's head, causing the victim inmate to suffer permanent and life-threatening injuries. Cardosa was sentenced to an additional eight years in prison on October 5, 2009. He was released from prison on April 8, 2019.

2009
John Travis Millner (32011-007) stabbed fellow inmate Vincent Earl Smith, Jr. at USP Big Sandy with a prison-made ice pick before strangling him to death in January 2009. Court records are unclear as to what sparked the conflict between the two men, both from Washington, DC. Millner was already serving a life sentence for shooting and killing a person using a high-powered rifle on New Year's Eve 2002. The Department of Justice considered pursuing the death penalty, but Millner was ultimately sentenced to serve an additional life sentence. Millner is now at ADX Florence.

2010
Steven Michael Reid, who had already been sentenced to 20 additional years in prison connection with a 2008 assault on staff (see above), stabbed a correctional officer in the stomach on June 24, 2010, with a  spear-type object made of two rolled up magazines and a sharpened piece of plexiglas. Reid had coated the tip of the weapon with feces. In January 2011, Reid was sentenced to an additional 15 years in prison, and is scheduled for release in 2049. Reid is now at USP Atlanta.

Notable inmates (current and former)

See also

List of U.S. federal prisons
Federal Bureau of Prisons
Incarceration in the United States

References

External links
USP Big Sandy at the Federal Bureau of Prisons (Official site)

2003 establishments in Kentucky
Buildings and structures in Martin County, Kentucky
Big Sandy
Prisons in Kentucky